Olivier Delaître and Fabrice Santoro were the defending champions, but lost in the quarterfinals this year.

Piet Norval and Kevin Ullyett won in the final 4–6, 7–6(7–5), 7–6(7–4), against Wayne Ferreira and Sandon Stolle.

Seeds

Draw

Draw

External links
Main Doubles Draw

1999 ATP Tour